Manombai (also known as Wokam) is one of the Aru languages, spoken by inhabitants of the Aru Islands, Indonesia.

References

Aru languages
Languages of Indonesia